West of El Dorado is a 1949 American Western film directed by Ray Taylor and written by Adele Buffington. The film stars Johnny Mack Brown, Max Terhune, Reno Browne, Teddy Infuhr, Milburn Morante and Terry Frost. The film was released on June 5, 1949, by Monogram Pictures.

Plot

Cast           
Johnny Mack Brown as Johnny Mack
Max Terhune as Alibi
Reno Browne as Mary
Teddy Infuhr as Larry Dallas
Milburn Morante as Brimstone
Terry Frost as Ed Stone
Marshall Reed as Barstow 
Boyd Stockman as Joe
Kenne Duncan as Steve Dallas
Bud Osborne as Jerry 
William Bailey as Sheriff Jack 
Artie Ortego as Indian
Bill Potter as Guitar Player Phil

References

External links
 

1949 films
American Western (genre) films
1949 Western (genre) films
Monogram Pictures films
Films directed by Ray Taylor
American black-and-white films
1940s English-language films
1940s American films